Kelli Gannon (born December 21, 1978 in Escondido, California) is a former field hockey midfield player from the United States, who made her international senior debut for the Women's National Team in 2001 with a goal against Mexico, at the inaugural Pan American Cup. A student of the University of Michigan, where she played for the Wolverines, she earned a total number of 60 caps, in which she scored 12 goals. Her younger sister Kristi later also played for the US National Team.

International Senior Tournaments
 2001 – Pan American Cup, Kingston, Jamaica (2nd)
 2002 – USA vs India WC Qualifying Series, Cannock, England (1st)
 2002 – World Cup, Perth, Australia (9th)
 2003 – Champions Challenge, Catania, Italy (5th)
 2003 – Pan American Games, Santo Domingo, Dominican Republic (2nd)

References
 Profile on US Field Hockey

1978 births
Living people
American female field hockey players
Michigan Wolverines field hockey players
Sportspeople from Escondido, California
Female field hockey midfielders